Fernando Franco de Ornelas (born 29 July 1976 in Caracas), is a retired Venezuelan football player.

Club career
De Ornelas has played for clubs in several countries in his career, such as Norwegian Odd Grenland and Hong Kong First Division League giant South China. He has had short spells with Crystal Palace, Celtic and Queens Park Rangers, Olympiakos Nicosia, and played for two teams called Marítimo, CS Marítimo of Portugal and Marítimo Caracas.

Retirement
After finishing his career as a footballer, de Ornelas settled in Bamble, Norway. He currently works as a Pentecostal pastor in a Norwegian free church.

International goals

|-
| 1. || 20 June 1999 || Misael Delgado, Valencia, Venezuela ||  || 3–0 || 3–0 || Friendly
|-
| 2. || 10 August 2000 || Alejandro Morera Soto, Alajuela, Costa Rica ||  || 1–4 || 1–5 || Friendly
|-
| 3. || 6 September 2006 || St. Jakob-Park, Basel, Switzerland ||  || 0–1 || 0–1 || Friendly
|-
| 4. || 28 March 2007 || José Pachencho Romero, Maracaibo, Venezuela ||  || 2–0 || 5–0 || Friendly
|-
| 5. || 28 March 2007 || José Pachencho Romero, Maracaibo, Venezuela ||  || 3–0 || 5–0 || Friendly
|-

References

External links

1976 births
Living people
Footballers from Caracas
Venezuelan people of Portuguese descent
Venezuelan footballers
Venezuela international footballers
2007 Copa América players
Deportivo Táchira F.C. players
South China AA players
Crystal Palace F.C. players
Celtic F.C. players
ŠK Slovan Bratislava players
Queens Park Rangers F.C. players
C.S. Marítimo players
1. FC Nürnberg players
Olympiakos Nicosia players
Odds BK players
Monagas S.C. players
Zulia F.C. players
Mjøndalen IF players
Primeira Liga players
Hong Kong First Division League players
Scottish Premier League players
Eliteserien players
English Football League players
Cypriot First Division players
Venezuelan expatriate footballers
Expatriate footballers in Cyprus
Expatriate footballers in Hong Kong
Expatriate footballers in Germany
Expatriate footballers in China
Expatriate footballers in Norway
Expatriate footballers in England
Expatriate footballers in Scotland
Venezuelan expatriate sportspeople in Germany
Venezuelan expatriate sportspeople in England
Venezuelan expatriate sportspeople in Scotland
Venezuelan expatriate sportspeople in Norway
Venezuelan expatriate sportspeople in Cyprus
Venezuelan expatriate sportspeople in China
Venezuelan expatriate sportspeople in Hong Kong
Association football midfielders
Slovak Super Liga players
Venezuelan Protestants
Pentecostal pastors
Portuguese people of Venezuelan descent